Bracht is a river of Hesse, Germany. It flows into the Kinzig in Wächtersbach. In large sections, it formed the border between the former Grand Duchy of Hesse-Darmstadt, on the right bank, and the Kingdom of Prussia on the left bank. Even after the WWII, this administrative segregation continued in different districts.

See also
List of rivers of Hesse

References

Rivers of Hesse
Rivers of the Vogelsberg
Rivers of Germany